Love After War is the fifth studio album by American R&B recording artist Robin Thicke. It was released on December 6, 2011, by Star Trak Entertainment in the United States. Love After War also features guest contributions by American rapper Lil Wayne.

Singles
The album's lead single and the title track "Love After War", was released on October 11, 2011. It officially impacted U.S. Urban radio on October 18, 2011. The music video was released on November 21, 2011. It impacted Smooth Jazz radio on November 22, 2011.

The album's second single "Pretty Lil' Heart" featuring Lil Wayne, was released on November 8, 2011. It impacted Urban and Urban Mainstream radio on November 21 and November 22, 2011. The music video was released on March 2, 2012.

"All Tied Up" was released as the album's third single. It impacted Urban Adult Contemporary radio on April 10, 2012. The music video was released on June 7, 2012.

Reception

Critical response

Allmusic editor Andy Kellman commented that "Thicke has settled into a suave, and even more swashbuckling, sound" and wrote of its second half of seductive ballads, "They don’t offer much in the way of development from Thicke’s recent past [...] but they should get the job done." Slant Magazine's Matthew Cole "Thicke spends most of Love After War singing in full voice, with mixed results", adding that "since Love After War stretches its seduction routine out for 17 tracks, the weight of its throwaway songs starts to add up." Nate Chinen of The New York Times wrote that Thicke "ask[s] you to admire his tasteful slickness without delving much deeper than the surface." Rolling Stone writer Jody Rosen stated, "Thicke spends a lot of time pondering romantic turmoil, but he's at his best when he reverts to classic loverman form: squeezing gentle bossa nova chords on his acoustic guitar, and letting his feathery upper register do the dirty work."

Kyle Anderson of Entertainment Weekly complimented Thicke's "creamy voice" and stated, "At 17 tracks, his loverman act grows a little exhausting, but perhaps he's just giving wannabe lotharios a seduction time frame to aspire to." Elysa Gardner of USA Today wrote that the album "can find him self-consciously smooth at times, suggesting too much artful foreplay. Still, this is a consistent showcase for his dextrous singing, which evokes pop/R&B icons from Marvin Gaye to Michael McDonald," complimenting "his ability to serve old-school textures with a fresh and not-too-shiny finish."

Commercial performance
The album debuted at number 22 on the Billboard 200 chart, with first-week sales of 41,000 copies in the United States.

Track listing

Sample credits
 "Never Give Up" contained a sample of José Pablo Moncayo's 1941 piece Huapango.

Personnel
Credits for Love After War adapted from Allmusic.

 Sarah Alminawi – marketing coordinator
 Beau Benton – publicity
 Al Branch – management
 Moses Burdon – design
 John Codling – cover painting
 Larry Cox – bass, Fender Rhodes, organ, piano, strings
 DJ Mormile – A&R
 Tiffany Ferguson – A&R
 Michael "Mike Banga" Gahadia – engineer
 M. Garcia – composer
 Karen Goodman – marketing
 Nick J. Groff – A&R
 Bernie Grundman – mastering
 Lamar Guillory – horn
 Andre Harrell – executive producer
 Justin Hergett – mixing assistant
 Stephanie Hsu – creation
 Neil Jacobson – executive producer, management
 Bobby Keyes – bass, composer, guitar, soloist
 Joe "Dr. Soose" Liemberg – horn
 Anthony Mandler – photography

 Garnett March – promoter
 Tony Maserati – mixing
 Justine Massa – creation
 Jarius Mozee – bass, guitar
 Jason Nower – photography
 Jennifer Paola – A&R
 Pro-Jay – bass, bells, drums, engineer, flute, guitar, horn, instrumentation, organ, producer, strings
 Furqan Raschke – A&R
 Brenda Reynoso – publicity
 Gee Roberson – management
 Jamie Roberts – legal counsel
 Kate Rosen – publicity
 Kam Sangha – producer
 Amanda Silverman – publicity
 Chris Tabron – mixing assistant
 Matty Taylor – bass
 Anna Tes – design
 Robin Thicke – art direction, bass, composer, drums, executive producer, Fender Rhodes, piano, producer, vocals
 Jeanne Venton – A&R
 Tracey Waples – management

Charts

Weekly charts

Year-end charts

References

External links
 Love After War at Metacritic

2011 albums
Robin Thicke albums
Albums produced by Robin Thicke
Interscope Records albums
Star Trak Entertainment albums